Alexander Radszun (born 6 May 1952) is a German actor. He appeared in more than ninety films since 1975.

Selected filmography

References

External links 

1952 births
Living people
German male film actors
German male television actors
20th-century German male actors
21st-century German male actors